Shepherd Hill Regional High School is located in Dudley, Massachusetts, United States. It is a regional high school covering the towns of Dudley and Charlton.  The school is part of the Dudley-Charlton Regional School District. The principal is Darren.C Elwell.  Shepherd Hill has over 1200 students.

History
Shepherd Hill was established in 1973. The school formerly included grades 712, but in 2000 Dudley and Charlton opened separate middle schools and the school is now restricted to grades 912.

Awards
On January 18, 1999 the school was selected by U.S. News & World Report as one of ninety-six 'Outstanding American high schools' and the school was congratulated in the Senate of the Commonwealth of Massachusetts.

Performing arts
Shepherd Hill has two competitive show choirs: the mixed-gender "Fantasy", the all-female "Illusion", and the all-male "Testostertones". The school is recognized as one of the first to have a show choir in New England, having established the group in 1984. The program also hosts an annual competition the first weekend in February.

Notable alumni
Sean McKeon, NFL player
Chris Lindstrom, NFL Player

References

External links
 Official site

Schools in Worcester County, Massachusetts
Educational institutions established in 1973
Public high schools in Massachusetts
Buildings and structures in Dudley, Massachusetts